Superman: The Animated Series is an American television series based on the DC Comics superhero Superman, which was produced by Warner Bros. Animation and originally aired on The WB from 1996 to 2000; lasting 54 episodes. 

The series is part of what has become known as the DC Animated Universe and was the first after the acclaimed Batman: The Animated Series.

Series overview

Episodes

Season 1 (1996–97)
All episodes of season one except the first five and last two were shown out of production order when originally aired.

Season 2 (1997–98)
Episodes of season two originally aired Saturday mornings prior to The New Batman/Superman Adventures.

Season 3 (1998–1999)
Episodes originally aired in the Kids WB! block of The New Batman/Superman Adventures.

Season 4 (1999–2000)
Episodes originally aired in the Kids WB! block of The New Batman/Superman Adventures.

Crossovers

References

Episodes
Superman television series episodes
Lists of DC Animated Universe episodes
Superman